Burton Roy Sugarman (born January 4, 1939) is an American film and television producer best known for creating and producing the iconic 1970s/early '80s variety series The Midnight Special, which served as a showcase for popular musical groups of the time.

Sugarman also produced the 1970s game shows Celebrity Sweepstakes, Whew! and The Wizard of Odds, and the short-lived series The Richard Pryor Show. During 1979, Sugarman also owned shares in Old Tucson Corporation, which owned the Old Tucson and Old Vegas amusement parks in Arizona and Nevada.

In the 1980s, he produced the motion pictures Kiss Me Goodbye, Extremities and Children of a Lesser God. He was the executive producer of the film Crimes of the Heart in 1986 and television series The Newlywed Game 1988. He was also part owner of Barris Industries (later known as the Guber-Peters Entertainment Company) before it was sold to Sony in 1989. During the late 1980s, Burt Sugarman was a member of The Giant Group, which they had bought investments in media firms, like broadcasting firm Reeves Entertainment Group, and television broadcaster/cable system operator/newspaper owner Media General in 1987.

Personal life
Sugarman married television personality and talk show host Mary Hart in 1989; they have one son. He had previously been married to Pauline Schur and to the late actress Carol Wayne, and was engaged to actresses Ann-Margret and Myrna Hansen.

Producer (as EP)

Himself

References

External links 

1939 births
Living people
20th-century American Jews
Businesspeople from Los Angeles
Television producers from California
21st-century American Jews